Somatidia fauveli is a species of beetle in the family Cerambycidae. It was described by Stephan von Breuning in 1961. It is known from New Caledonia.

References

fauveli
Beetles described in 1961